The Rajasthan football team is an Indian football team representing Rajasthan in Indian state football competitions including the Santosh Trophy. They made history by qualify for the final rounds of 75th Santosh Trophy (2022), but failed to win it.

Team 
The following players were called up prior to the 2022 Santosh Trophy

Honours 
 B.C. Roy Trophy
 Winners (1): 1963–64
 Mir Iqbal Hussain Trophy
 Winners (1): 1991–92

References

External links
 Rajasthan Football Association Website

Santosh Trophy teams
Football in Rajasthan
Year of establishment missing